Colin Herbert Campbell (4 November 1887 – 25 August 1955) was a British field hockey player who competed in the 1920 Summer Olympics as a member of the British field hockey team, which won the gold medal.

References

External links
 
Colin Campbell's profile at Sports Reference.com

1887 births
1955 deaths
English Olympic medallists
British male field hockey players
Olympic field hockey players of Great Britain
Field hockey players at the 1920 Summer Olympics
Olympic gold medallists for Great Britain
Olympic medalists in field hockey
Medalists at the 1920 Summer Olympics